The 9th Infantry Division of the Army of the Republic of Vietnam (ARVN)—the army of the nation state of South Vietnam that existed from 1961 to 1975—was part of the IV Corps that oversaw the southernmost region of South Vietnam, the Mekong Delta. The 9th Infantry Division was based in Sa Dec 1962 - 1972 and Vinh Long 1972 - 1975 throughout the war.


History
In March 1961 the newly-formed Division began a 22 week training programme.

By the end of 1965 the US advisers to the Division regarded Division commander Col. Lam Quang Thi as "fair" but lacking in "confidence and aggressiveness." The Division had suffered over 1800 desertions in the last six months of the year and morale was low.

From 15–19 November 1967 the Division participated in Operation Kien Giang 9-1 with the ARVN 7th Division and the 5th Marine Battalion and the US Mobile Riverine Force against the Viet Cong (VC) 263rd Battalion's Base Area 470 in western Định Tường Province. The operation rendered the 263rd Battalion combat ineffective.

In January 1970 John Paul Vann at the request of Ambassador Ellsworth Bunker produced his own evaluations of IV Corps' commanders which differed markedly from the official judgments of MACV. Vann recommended all three division commanders and the special zone commander for relief, however only the 7th Division commander was replaced.

In 1970 IV Corps commander Nguyễn Viết Thanh withdrew the Division from its area security missions and began using it as the Corps' reaction force.

During 1971 the Division focused on destruction of People's Army of Vietnam (PAVN) and VC Base Area 400 in the That Son (Seven Mountains) region.

By the end of 1972 the Division was responsible for Sa Đéc, Vĩnh Long, Vĩnh Bình and Kien Hoa Provinces. The Division was opposed by only one main force regiment, the D3 under the command of VC Military Region 3. One of only two main force regiments in South Vietnam still considered to be predominantly VC the D3 Regiment was probably operating in southeastern Vinh Long.

During the Battle of An Lộc, on 15 May 1972 a task force of the 15th Regiment which was redeployed from the Mekong Delta to reinforce ARVN forces and the 9th Armored Cavalry Squadron, 21st Division moved north, east of Route 13 bypassing the People's Army of Vietnam (PAVN) 209th Regiment, 7th Division roadblock at Tau O to establish a fire support base at Tan Khai 10km south of An Lộc. On 20 May the PAVN 141st Regiment attacked the base at Tan Khai and continued attacking unsuccessfully for 3 days against a determined defense before withdrawing.

With its 15th Regiment and the 21st Division engaged at An Lộc the remainder of the Division and the 7th Division and Regional and Popular Forces were left to defend against the PAVN/VC Easter Offensive in southern Cambodia and the Mekong Delta. While stretched thin these forces prevented the PAVN/VC from achieving their objectives in the Delta.

In March 1973 during the Battle of Hồng Ngự the PAVN concentrated the 174th and 207th Regiments, 6th Division, the 272nd Regiment (detached from the 9th Division) and elements of the 75th Artillery Group in Base Area 704 in Prey Veng Province, Cambodia northwest of Hồng Ngự. With the 207th leading, supported by artillery, the PAVN attacked from Base Area 704 towards Hồng Ngự in an attempt to cut the South Vietnamese supply convoys up the Mekong River into Cambodia. Not only did they meet immediate heavy resistance, but their rear area was pounded by USAF B-52's and tactical bombers. While US forces had disengaged from Vietnam on 28 January 1973 in accordance with the terms of the Paris Peace Accords, US military operations in Cambodia and Laos would continue until 15 August 1973 and the USAF was heavily engaged in support of the Khmer National Armed Forces campaign to clear the banks of the Mekong from the Vietnam border to Phnom Penh. One B-52 strike on 23 April 1973 north of the border between the Mekong and the Hồng Ngự stream caught a large portion of the attacking force with survivors reported seeing impressed civilians carrying the bodies or more than 100 PAVN from the area. In mid-April the 15th Infantry Regiment, the 2nd Armored Cavalry Squadron and a Regional Forces Group counterattacked against the PAVN. Although casualties were heavy, Republic of Vietnam Air Force and Navy support helped enable the ARVN troops to clear the east bank of the Mekong from Hồng Ngự to the Cambodian frontier. The attack inflicted heavy casualties on the PAVN and dealt a damaging blow to their morale. By the end of May, one battalion of the 207th Regiment had only 100 men.

In late 1973 Brig. Gen. Huynh Van Lac replaced Maj. Gen. Tran Ba Di as commander of the Division. A reorganization of IV Corps drew all Rangers out of the Corps and eliminated the 44th Special Tactical Zone. This change required the Division to assume responsibility for Châu Đốc and northern Kiên Giang Provinces as well as Kien Phong Province. It turned over its two southern provinces of Vĩnh Long and Vĩnh Bình to the 7th Division, recovered its 14th Regiment, which had been under the operational control of the 7th Division, and released its 15th Regiment to the operational control of the 21st Division in Chuong Thien Province. Thus with two infantry regiments, General Lac replaced the equivalent of three Ranger regiments in the northern districts of the border provinces. It was feasible only because the enemy main force in the area had been so severely damaged in the Hồng Ngự and Châu Đốc battles.

From 15 February to 14 May 1974 the 14th Regiment and one battalion from the 16th Regiment together with units from the 7th Division participated in the Battle of Tri Phap attacking a PAVN base area in Định Tường Province before PAVN forces arrived there.

In April 1974 during the Battle of Svay Rieng the 15th Infantry formed a task force with part of the 16th Armored Cavalry Squadron under the control of the 7th Division which, together with a 7th Division task force conducted a sweep of the Elephant's Foot area of Cambodia. In 12 days of fighting in the border area, these two mobile task forces killed 850 PAVN soldiers, captured 31, collected over 100 weapons, and suffered fewer than 300 casualties, including 39 killed.

Organisation
Component units:
 14th Infantry Regiment
 15th Infantry Regiment
 16th Infantry Regiment
 90th, 91st, 92nd and 93rd Artillery Battalions
 2nd Armored Cavalry Squadron
 US Advisory Team 60

References 

Divisions of South Vietnam